Grindelia palmeri is a rare North American species of flowering plants in the family Asteraceae. It is native to northeastern Mexico, found only in the State of San Luis Potosí.

Each head has 35-30 ray flowers surrounding numerous disc flowers.

References

External links
photo of herbarium specimen at Missouri Botanical Garden, collected in San Luis Potosí in 1900, isotype of Grindelia palmeri

palmeri
Flora of San Luis Potosí
Plants described in 1934